Marian Krzaklewski (born 23 August 1950 in Kolbuszowa) is a Polish politician. A member of Solidarity since the 1980s, he was one of the most known and influential Polish politicians in the late 1990s, when he created the Solidarity Electoral Action (AWS). The AWS coalition, especially when it joined forces with Freedom Union, was a major accomplishment in Polish politics, transforming the fragmented post-Solidarity camp into a powerful political force.

Krzaklewski studied information science from Politechnika Śląska and holds a PhD degree. In 1980 he became involved with Solidarity, the famous Polish anti-communist trade union and social movement. Within the movement he was active in the Silesia region.

In 1991 he replaced Lech Wałęsa (then president of Poland) as the chairman of Solidarity. In opposition both to the government of Wałęsa and later the left-wing SLD, he was one of the founders of the center and right-wing Solidarity Electoral Action, which eventually became victorious in the 1997 Polish parliamentary election. Krzaklewski, who was elected as a deputy to the Polish parliament (Sejm), was considered for the post of Prime Minister, however in the end the post went to Jerzy Buzek. Amid the decreasing support for AWS, political infighting and corruption (TKM), he contested the 2000 Polish presidential election. As the major right-wing candidate, he polled very poorly, achieving just 15.6% of the vote. (Incumbent Kwasniewski won a majority in the first round). Subsequently, AWS suffered a crushing defeat in the 2001 Polish parliamentary election.

Krzaklewski resigned as the leader of AWS in 2001 and was replaced as chairman of the Solidarity trade Union by Janusz Śniadek in 2002. He currently is a member of the National Commission of NSSZ Solidarity and works as an EU expert in Brussels. Krzaklewski failed to return to politics running from his native region in South-Eastern Poland from the ruling Civic Platform list.

Notes

1950 births
Living people
People from Kolbuszowa
Solidarity Electoral Action politicians
Civic Platform politicians
Polish trade unionists
Candidates in the 2000 Polish presidential election
Solidarity (Polish trade union) activists
Members of the Polish Sejm 1997–2001
Polish dissidents